Mata (Matı) is a rural locality (a village) in Shtandinsky Selsoviet, Baltachevsky District, Bashkortostan, Russia. The population was 407 as of 2010. There are 7 streets.

Geography 
Mata is located 23 km northeast of Starobaltachevo (the district's administrative centre) by road. Shtandy is the nearest rural locality.

References 

Rural localities in Baltachevsky District